The Western Pacific roughy (Hoplostethus japonicus) is a species of slimehead found in the Northwest Pacific along Japan's southern coast in Sagami Bay, Suruga Bay, and the Sea of Japan.

References

External links
 

Hoplostethus
Taxa named by Franz Martin Hilgendorf
Fish described in 1879
Fish of the Pacific Ocean
Fish of Japan